Archar Peninsula located in the North-Western extremity of Greenwich Island, Antarctica.  The three km long peninsula is bounded by Razlog Cove to the North and McFarlane Strait to the South.  Its western half is snow-free in summer.  The peninsula is named after the settlement of Archar in Northwestern Bulgaria, successor of the ancient town of Ratiaria.

See also
 Tangra 2004/05
 List of Bulgarian toponyms in Antarctica
 Antarctic Place-names Commission

Maps
 South Shetland Islands. Scale 1:200000 topographic map. DOS 610 Sheet W 62 58. Tolworth, UK, 1968.
 South Shetland Islands. Scale 1:200000 topographic map. DOS 610 Sheet W 62 60. Tolworth, UK, 1968.
 L.L. Ivanov et al. Antarctica: Livingston Island and Greenwich Island, South Shetland Islands. Scale 1:100000 topographic map. Sofia: Antarctic Place-names Commission of Bulgaria, 2005.
 L.L. Ivanov. Antarctica: Livingston Island and Greenwich, Robert, Snow and Smith Islands. Scale 1:120000 topographic map.  Troyan: Manfred Wörner Foundation, 2009.  
 Antarctic Digital Database (ADD). Scale 1:250000 topographic map of Antarctica. Scientific Committee on Antarctic Research (SCAR). Since 1993, regularly updated.
 L.L. Ivanov. Antarctica: Livingston Island and Smith Island. Scale 1:100000 topographic map. Manfred Wörner Foundation, 2017.

References
 Archar Peninsula. SCAR Composite Gazetteer of Antarctica.
 Bulgarian Antarctic Gazetteer. Antarctic Place-names Commission. (details in Bulgarian, basic data in English)

External links
 Archar Peninsula. Copernix satellite image

Landforms of Greenwich Island
Bulgaria and the Antarctic
Peninsulas of the South Shetland Islands